The Rhode Island Indians were a professional American football team based in Providence, Rhode Island. The team was formed in 1965 as a charter member of the Continental Football League. The team (sometimes referred to as the Providence Indians) completed their lone COFL season with a 3-11 record. Prior to their final home game the Indians announced they were withdrawing from the league. Lack of public support was cited as the main factor behind the team's failure.

Season-by-season

References

Continental Football League teams
American football teams in Rhode Island
Sports in Providence, Rhode Island
American football teams established in 1965
American football teams disestablished in 1965
1965 establishments in Rhode Island
1965 disestablishments in Rhode Island